Allan Cove is a cove and a former hamlet in the Canadian province of Newfoundland and Labrador. It is located on Newfoundland's south coast near McCallum.

See also
List of ghost towns in Newfoundland and Labrador

Ghost towns in Newfoundland and Labrador